The freguesias (civil parishes) of Portugal are listed in by municipality according to the following format:
 concelho
 freguesias

Cabeceiras de Basto
Abadim
Alvite
Arco de Baúlhe
Basto
Bucos
Cabeceiras de Basto
Cavez
Faia
Gondiães
Outeiro
Painzela
Passos
Pedraça
Refojos de Basto
Rio Douro
Vila Nune
Vilar de Cunhas

Cadaval
Alguber
Cadaval
Cercal
Figueiros
Lamas
Painho
Peral
Pêro Moniz
Vermelha
Vilar

Caldas da Rainha

Until 28 January 2013
A-dos-Francos
Alvorninha
Caldas da Rainha — Nossa Senhora do Pópulo
Caldas da Rainha — Santo Onofre
Carvalhal Benfeito
Coto
Foz do Arelho
Landal
Nadadouro
Salir de Matos
Salir do Porto
Santa Catarina
São Gregório
Serra do Bouro
Tornada
Vidais

Effective 29 January 2013

 A dos Francos
 Alvorninha
 União das Freguesias de Caldas da Rainha — Nossa Senhora do Pópulo, Coto e São Gregório
 União das Freguesias de Caldas da Rainha — Santo Onofre e Serra do Bouro
 Carvalhal Benfeito
 Foz do Arelho
 Landal
 Nadadouro
 Salir de Matos
 Santa Catarina
 União das Freguesias de Tornada e Salir do Porto
 Vidais

Calheta (Azores)
 Calheta
 Norte Pequeno
 Ribeira Seca
 Santo Antão
 Topo

Calheta (Madeira)
Arco da Calheta
Calheta
Estreito da Calheta
Fajã da Ovelha
Jardim do Mar
Paul do Mar
Ponta do Pargo
Prazeres

Câmara de (Madeira)
Câmara de Lobos
Curral das Freiras
Estreito de Câmara de Lobos
Jardim da Serra
Quinta Grande

Caminha
Âncora
Arga de Baixo
Arga de Cima
Arga de São João
Argela
Azevedo
Caminha (Matriz)
Cristelo
Dem
Gondar
Lanhelas
Moledo
Orbacém
Riba de Âncora
Seixas
Venade
Vila Praia de Âncora
Vilar de Mouros
Vilarelho
Vile

Campo Maior
Nossa Senhora da Expectação
Nossa Senhora da Graça dos Degolados
São João Baptista

Cantanhede
Ançã
Bolho
Cadima
Camarneira
Cantanhede
Cordinhã
Corticeiro de Cima
Covões
Febres
Murtede
Ourentã
Outil
Pocariça
Portunhos
Sanguinheira
São Caetano
Sepins
Tocha
Vilamar

Carrazeda de Ansiães
 Amedo
 Beira Grande
 Belver
 Carrazeda de Ansiães
 Castanheiro
 Fonte Longa
 Lavandeira
 Linhares
 Marzagão
 Mogo de Malta
 Parambos
 Pereiros
 Pinhal do Norte
 Pombal
 Ribalonga
 Seixo de Ansiães
 Selores
 Vilarinho da Castanheira
 Zedes

Carregal do Sal
Beijós
Cabanas de Viriato
Currelos
Oliveira do Conde
Papízios
Parada
Sobral

Cartaxo
Cartaxo
Ereira
Lapa
Pontével
Valada
Vale da Pedra
Vale da Pinta
Vila Chã de Ourique

Cascais
Alcabideche
Carcavelos
Cascais
Estoril
Parede
São Domingos de Rana

Castanheira de Pêra
Castanheira de Pêra
Coentral

Castelo Branco
Alcains
Almaceda
Benquerenças
Cafede
Castelo Branco
Cebolais de Cima
Escalos de Baixo
Escalos de Cima
Freixial do Campo
Juncal do Campo
Lardosa
Louriçal do Campo
Lousa
Malpica do Tejo
Mata
Monforte da Beira
Ninho do Açor
Póvoa de Rio de Moinhos
Retaxo
Salgueiro do Campo
Santo André das Tojeiras
São Vicente da Beira
Sarzedas
Sobral do Campo
Tinalhas

Castelo de Paiva
Bairros
Fornos
Paraíso
Pedorido
Raiva
Real
Santa Maria de Sardoura
São Martinho de Sardoura
Sobrado

Castelo de Vide
Nossa Senhora da Graça de Póvoa e Meada
Santa Maria da Devesa
Santiago Maior
São João Baptista

Castro Daire
Almofala
Alva
Cabril
Castro Daire
Cujó
Ermida
Ester
Gafanhão
Gosende
Mamouros
Mezio
Mões
Moledo
Monteiras
Moura Morta
Parada de Ester
Pepim
Picão
Pinheiro
Reriz
Ribolhos
São Joaninho

Castro Marim
Altura
Azinhal
Castro Marim (freguesias)
Odeleite

Castro Verde
Casével
Castro Verde
Entradas
Santa Bárbara de Padrões
São Marcos da Ataboeira

Celorico da Beira
Açores
Baraçal
Cadafaz
Carrapichana
Casas do Soeiro
Celorico (Santa Maria)
Celorico (São Pedro)
Cortiçô da Serra
Forno Telheiro
Lajeosa do Mondego
Linhares
Maçal do Chão
Mesquitela
Minhocal
Prados
Rapa
Ratoeira
Salgueirais
Vale de Azares
Velosa
Vide entre Vinhas
Vila Boa do Mondego

Celorico de Basto
Agilde
Arnóia
Basto (Santa Tecla)
Basto (São Clemente)
Borba de Montanha
Britelo
Caçarilhe
Canedo de Basto
Carvalho
Codeçoso
Corgo
Fervença
Gagos
Gémeos
Infesta
Molares
Moreira do Castelo
Ourilhe
Rego
Ribas
Vale de Bouro
Veade

Chamusca
Carregueira
Chamusca
Chouto
Parreira
Pinheiro Grande
Ulme
Vale de Cavalos

Chaves
Águas Frias
Anelhe
Arcossó
Bobadela
Bustelo
Calvão
Cela
Cimo de Vila da Castanheira
Curalha
Eiras
Ervededo
Faiões
Lama de Arcos
Loivos
Madalena
Mairos
Moreiras
Nogueira da Montanha
Oucidres
Oura
Outeiro Seco
Paradela
Póvoa de Agrações
Redondelo
Roriz
Samaiões
Sanfins
Sanjurge
Santa Cruz/Trindade
Santa Leocádia
Santa Maria Maior
Santo António de Monforte
Santo Estêvão
São Julião de Montenegro
São Pedro de Agostém
São Vicente
Seara Velha
Selhariz
Soutelinho da Raia
Soutelo
Travancas
Tronco
Vale de Anta
Vidago
Vila Verde da Raia
Vilar de Nantes
Vilarelho da Raia
Vilarinho das Paranheiras
Vilas Boas
Vilela do Tâmega
Vilela Seca

Cinfães
Alhões
Bustelo
Cinfães
Espadanedo
Ferreiros de Tendais
Fornelos (Cinfães)
Gralheira
Moimenta
Nespereira
Oliveira do Douro
Ramires
Santiago de Piães
São Cristóvão de Nogueira
Souselo
Tarouquela
Tendais
Travanca

Coimbra

Until 28 January 2013 
Almalaguês
Almedina
Ameal
Antanhol
Antuzede
Arzila
Assafarge
Botão
Brasfemes
Castelo Viegas
Ceira
Cernache
Eiras
Lamarosa
Ribeira de Frades
Santa Clara
Santa Cruz
Santo António dos Olivais
São Bartolomeu
São João do Campo
São Martinho de Árvore
São Martinho do Bispo
São Paulo de Frades
São Silvestre
Sé Nova
Souselas
Taveiro
Torre de Vilela
Torres do Mondego
Trouxemil
Vil de Matos

Effective 29 January 2013
 Almalaguês
Antuzede e Vil de Matos
Assafarge e Antanhol
Brasfemes
Ceira
Cernache
Coimbra (Sé Nova, Santa Cruz, Almedina e São Bartolomeu)
Eiras e São Paulo de Frades
Santa Clara e Castelo Viegas
Santo António dos Olivais
São João do Campo
São Martinho de Árvore e Lamarosa
São Martinho do Bispo e Ribeira de Frades
São Silvestre
Souselas e Botão
Taveiro, Ameal e Arzila
Torres do Mondego
Trouxemil e Torre de Vilela

Condeixa-a-Nova
Anobra
Belide
Bem da Fé
Condeixa-a-Nova
Condeixa-a-Velha
Ega
Furadouro
Sebal
Vila Seca
Zambujal

Constância
Constância
Montalvo
Santa Margarida da Coutada

Coruche
Biscainho
Branca
Coruche
Couço
Erra
Fajarda
Santana do Mato
São José da Lamarosa

Corvo (Azores)
 Vila do Corvo

Covilhã
Aldeia de São Francisco de Assis
Aldeia do Souto
Barco
Boidobra
Canhoso
Cantar-Galo
Casegas
Cortes do Meio
Coutada
Covilhã (Conceição)
Covilhã (Santa Maria)
Covilhã (São Martinho)
Covilhã (São Pedro)
Dominguizo
Erada
Ferro
Orjais
Ourondo
Paul
Peraboa
Peso
São Jorge da Beira
Sarzedo
Sobral de São Miguel
Teixoso
Tortosendo
Unhais da Serra
Vale Formoso
Vales do Rio
Verdelhos
Vila do Carvalho

Crato
Aldeia da Mata
Crato e Mártires
Flor da Rosa
Gáfete
Monte da Pedra
Vale do Peso

Cuba
Cuba
Faro do Alentejo
Vila Alva
Vila Ruiva

References

C